{{DISPLAYTITLE:C25H25NO}}
The molecular formula C25H25NO (molar mass: 355.47 g/mol, exact mass: 355.1936 u) may refer to:

 JWH-007
 JWH-019
 JWH-047
 JWH-122

Molecular formulas